Diaconescu is a Romanian surname. Notable people with the surname include:

Camelia Diaconescu (b. 1963), Olympic rower
Cristian Diaconescu (b. 1959), diplomat and politician
Dan Diaconescu (b. 1967), politician, media tycoon, television presenter
Ioana Diaconescu (b. 1979), Olympic swimmer
Ion Diaconescu (1917-2011), dissident and politician
Mircea Diaconescu (b. 1929), composer

Romanian-language surnames